Hamilton City Libraries are a group of six libraries in Hamilton, New Zealand, owned by the local city council. They lend fiction and non-fiction (for all ages), magazines, audiobooks, CDs and DVDs. From November 2016 to 9 July 2018, a substitute library compensated for the temporarily closed Central branch, and the libraries closed for over 2 months for COVID-19 in 2020. Waikato residents without local libraries can freely use the Hamilton libraries.

Public library history 
In 1871 Hamilton Institute appointed a librarian, with support from Auckland Provincial Council. By 1874 its reading room had 209 books and 72 subscribers, but, although its books were largely saved from a fire, the secretary then decamped with the funds.

A poll under the Public Libraries Act 1869 rejected a rate to set up a library by 17:7 in 1883; without a council decision, the Act required at least 10 ratepayers to request a poll. Next year a new library was established by subscriptions in the Union Bridge toll house, tolls having ended in January 1883, and it was officially opened on 10 October 1884. A new building at the south end of Victoria Street opened on 22 April 1899. Andrew Carnegie library, designed by Rigby and Warren, opposite Garden Place, was opened by Sir Joseph Ward on 17 February 1908. By 1928 it had 892 subscribers and 10,000 books and, by 1948, 2,344 subscribers and 130,674 books. In June 1960 a new council building opened on Worley St and the library moved from the Carnegie site, which was sold. The Carnegie Library briefly became a Lions opp shop, before being demolished about 1961.  In 1968 it moved to William Paul Hall, formerly the Waikato Winter Show building and has been in Garden Place since 20 March 1993.

Frankton Library opened on 22 December 1923 and in 1950 became a branch of Hamilton Public Library.

, Hamilton had one of the country's largest public libraries.

Branches

There are six current branches:

References

External links
 Hamilton City Libraries website
 history of Hamilton libraries from 1870 and 1980-2009(archive link)
 photo of Carnegie Library about 1910

Buildings and structures in Hamilton, New Zealand
Culture in Hamilton, New Zealand
Tourist attractions in Hamilton, New Zealand
Hamilton City Libraries
Education in Hamilton, New Zealand
1870 establishments in New Zealand